Alexander Pipa (born 12 June 1983) is a retired German international rugby union player, playing for the TSV Handschuhsheim in the Rugby-Bundesliga and the German national rugby union team.

He was born in Heidelberg, and has been playing rugby since 1996.

Pipa has also played for the Germany's 7's side in the past, like at the 2008 and 2009 Hannover Sevens and the 2009 London Sevens. He was also part of the German Sevens side at the World Games 2005 in Duisburg, where Germany finished 8th.

In the 2008–09 and 2009-10 seasons, Pipa was the top try scorer in the Bundesliga with 22 tries in each season. After the 2010-11 season, Pipa retired from the sport to concentrate on his private life and his job career.

Honours

Club
 German rugby union championship
 Runners up: 2005
 German rugby union cup
 Winners: 2005

National team
 European Nations Cup - Division 2
 Champions: 2008

Personal
 Rugby-Bundesliga
 Top try scorer: 2008-09, 2009–10

Stats
Alexander Pipa's personal statistics in club and international rugby:

Club

 As of 21 August 2011

National team

European Nations Cup

Friendlies & other competitions

 As of 21 March 2010

References

External links
 Alexander Pipa at scrum.com
   Alexander Pipa at totalrugby.de

1983 births
Living people
German rugby union players
Germany international rugby union players
TSV Handschuhsheim players
Rugby union flankers
Sportspeople from Heidelberg